Janq'u K'ark'a (Aymara janq'u white, k'ark'a crevice, fissure, crack, "white crevice", also  spelled Jankho Kharka) is a mountain in the Cordillera Real in the Andes of Bolivia, about  high. It is situated in the La Paz Department, Larecaja Province, Sorata Municipality, and in the Omasuyos Province, Achacachi Municipality. Janq'u K'ark'a lies south of the Janq'u Uma-Illampu massif, southeast of the mountain Quña Quñani and the lakes Warawarani (Huara Huarani) and Jisk'a Warawarani (Jiskha Huara Huarani).

See also 
 Q'ara Qullu

References 

Mountains of La Paz Department (Bolivia)